Pete Sampras was the defending champion but did not compete that year.

Michael Chang won in the final 6–3, 6–4 against Todd Woodbridge.

Seeds
All sixteen seeds received a bye to the second round.

  Michael Chang (champion)
  Andre Agassi (second round)
  Todd Martin (semifinals)
  MaliVai Washington (second round)
  Paul Haarhuis (quarterfinals)
  Jason Stoltenberg (second round)
  Richey Reneberg (quarterfinals)
  Todd Woodbridge (final)
  Alex O'Brien (second round)
  Mark Philippoussis (second round)
 n/a
  Chris Woodruff (third round)
  Jonas Björkman (semifinals)
  Mark Woodforde (second round)
  Kenneth Carlsen (third round)
  Vince Spadea (second round)

Draw

Finals

Top half

Section 1

Section 2

Bottom half

Section 3

Section 4

External links
 ATP main draw

U.S. National Indoor Championships
1997 ATP Tour